; real name: Kaiho Shōeki, "brush name": Yusho (alternative names: Josetsusai, Yūkeisai, Yūtoku), was a Japanese painter of the Azuchi–Momoyama period. He was born in Ōmi province, the fifth son of Kaihō Tsunachika, who was a vassal of Azai Nagamasa.

At an early age he became a page at the Tōfuku-ji (temple) in Kyōto and, later a lay priest. He served there under the abbot and associated with the leading Zen priests of Kyōto. In his forties, Yūshō turned to painting and became a pupil in the Kanō School, either under the famous Kanō Motonobu or his grandson Kanō Eitoku. Then, he worked at Jurakudai, under the patronage of Toyotomi Hideyoshi and the Emperor Go-Yōzei.

At first, he patterned his work after Song painter Liang Kai, doing only monochrome ink paintings, using a "reduced brush stroke" (gempitsu), relying more on ink washes than sharp hard strokes. Later, he worked in fashionable rich colors and gold leaf. Artistically on a level with Hasegawa Tōhaku and Kanō Eitoku, he gave his name Kaihō to the style of painting he and his followers practiced. 

As of the Metropolitan Museum of Art exhibition of 1975, most of the artist's extant works were ink paintings produced during his late sixties for the Zen temple Kennin-ji in Kyoto.

Important Cultural Property status
Several of Yūshō's works have been designated as Registered Important Cultural Property. Among these are the following:

Landscape, 1599. Two hanging scrolls, ink on paper. Located in Kennin-ji, Kyoto, Japan
Plum and pine, around 1599. Four sliding doors, ink on paper. Located in Zenkyō-an (Kennin-ji), Kyoto, Japan (See detail in "Oiseaux sur une branche de pin" in gallery below.)
The four accomplishments, late 16th century. Pair of six-fold screens, ink and light color on paper. Located in Reitō-in (Kennin-ji), Kyoto, Japan

Gallery

References

External links
Momoyama, Japanese Art in the Age of Grandeur, an exhibition catalog from The Metropolitan Museum of Art (fully available online as PDF), which contains material on Kaihō Yūshō
Bridge of dreams: the Mary Griggs Burke collection of Japanese art, a catalog from The Metropolitan Museum of Art Libraries (fully available online as PDF), which contains material on Kaihō Yūshō (see index)

1533 births
1615 deaths
Japanese painters
Artists from Shiga Prefecture